One Voice is the third live album released by Barbra Streisand. Her first full-length concert in twenty years, One Voice began as a benefit performance at Streisand's Malibu, California home on September 6, 1986.  The concert was broadcast on HBO in December that year, followed by the album's release in April 1987.

The album contains Streisand's only recordings of two Harold Arlen classics "Over the Rainbow" and "It's a New World" as well as her version of "America the Beautiful".

The concert and album raised millions for Democratic candidates and for charities committed to anti-nuclear activities and the preservation of our environment, civil liberties, and human rights.

Track listing
"Somewhere" (Leonard Bernstein, Stephen Sondheim) – 3:19
"Evergreen" (Barbra Streisand, Paul Williams) – 3:01
"Something's Coming" (Leonard Bernstein, Stephen Sondheim) – 4:12
"People" (Bob Merrill, Jule Styne) – 4:49
"Send in the Clowns" (Stephen Sondheim) – 4:38
"Over the Rainbow" (Harold Arlen, Yip Harburg) – 3:41
"Guilty" (Barry Gibb, Maurice Gibb, Robin Gibb) Duet with Barry Gibb – 5:25
"What Kind of Fool" (Barry Gibb, Albhy Galuten) Duet with Barry Gibb – 4:31
"Papa, Can You Hear Me? (Michel Legrand, Alan Bergman, Marilyn Bergman) – 4:32
"The Way We Were (Alan Bergman, Marilyn Bergman, Marvin Hamlisch) – 3:48
"It's a New World" (Harold Arlen, Ira Gershwin) – 3:03
"Happy Days Are Here Again" (Milton Ager, Jack Yellen) – 4:42
"America the Beautiful" (Katharine Lee Bates, Samuel A. Ward) – 5:02

Video release 
The concert was produced as an HBO television special, broadcast December 27, 1986.  The One Voice album and a VHS home video of the concert were both released in April 1987.  A DVD release of One Voice appeared in 2006. The concert footage includes some of the many celebrities in attendance, as well as bits of Robin Williams performing an ad-libbed monologue to open the show.

Personnel
Barbra Streisand – vocals
Barry Gibb - vocals (Tracks 7–8)
Don Sawyer – acoustic guitar, electric guitar
John Pierce – bass guitar, synthesizer
Randy Kerber – keyboards, piano
Chad Wackerman – drums
Michael G. Fisher – percussion
Randy Waldman - synthesizer
Richard Marx – background vocals
Nyles Steiner - Steinerphone (EWI)
Richard Baskin - Album Producer

Charts

Weekly charts

Year-end charts

Certifications and sales
One Voice has been certified Platinum in the United States and New Zealand for sales of 1,000,000 and 15,000 copies. According to the liner notes of Barbra's  retrospective box set: Just for the Record, the album also received a record certification in Australia, Canada, the Netherlands and the United Kingdom.

References

External links
 One Voice concert video (1986)
 One Voice live album (1987)

1987 live albums
Barbra Streisand live albums
Columbia Records live albums